Sigtrygg (Sigtryggr) is an Old Norse given name, composed of the elements sig "victory" and trygg "trusty, true". It is cognate with the Anglo-Saxon Sihtric.

In Norse-Gaelic Ireland (9th to 11th centuries) rendered as Sitric or Sihtric (the patronymic Sigtryggsson as mac Sitriuc).

The name is only rarely given in modern Scandinavian countries; it is mostly encountered in Iceland, in the form Sigtryggur, with 99 entries for the name in the Icelandic white pages as of 2013.

People called Sigtrygg
The names may refer to any of the following people:
Sigtryggr, Sure of victory (Victory-true), one of the 99 names of Óðinn Alföðr 
Kings of Dublin:
Sigtrygg Ivarsson, 888–893
Sigtrygg Caech (Sigtrygg Gael), 917–921, king of York 921–927
Sigtrygg, 941–943
Sigtrygg Silkbeard Olafsson, 989–1036
Sigtrygg Gnupasson, a 10th-century Danish king of the House of Olaf
Sigtrygg of Nerike, a Swede who met Saint Olaf
Sitric the Dane, an 11th-century ruler of Waterford
Sitric mac Ualgairg,   king of Breifne 1256/7

See also
Mac Sitric, Irish masculine surname
Sitric Roads, Stoneybatter, County Dublin
Irish people
Norse people

References

Lena Peterson, Nordiskt runnamnslexikon (2002)

External links
nordicnames.de

Scandinavian masculine given names